The 2015–16 LNH Division 1 was the 64th season of the LNH Division 1, the French premier handball league, and the 39th season consisting of only one league. It ran from 21 August 2015 to 4 June 2016.

Team information 

The following 14 clubs competed in the LNH Division 1 during the 2015–16 season:

League table

Schedule and results
In the table below the home teams are listed on the left and the away teams along the top.

Season statistics

Top goalscorers

Monthly awards

Number of teams by regions

References

External links
 Official site 

2015–16 domestic handball leagues
LNH Division 1
LNH Division 1